Jeon Kwang-In  (Hangul: 전광인; born  in Hadong, Gyeongsangnam-do) is a South Korean male volleyball player. He was part of the South Korea men's national volleyball team at the 2014 FIVB Volleyball Men's World Championship in Poland. He played for KEPCO Vixtorm.

Clubs
 KEPCO Vixtorm (2013-2018)
 Cheonan Hyundai Capital Skywalkers (2018-)

References

1991 births
Living people
South Korean men's volleyball players
Place of birth missing (living people)
Asian Games medalists in volleyball
Volleyball players at the 2014 Asian Games
Volleyball players at the 2018 Asian Games
Medalists at the 2014 Asian Games
Medalists at the 2018 Asian Games
Asian Games silver medalists for South Korea
Asian Games bronze medalists for South Korea
Sportspeople from South Gyeongsang Province
21st-century South Korean people